Vladislav Posedkin (born 15 August 1970) is a Russian bobsledder. He competed in the four man event at the 1998 Winter Olympics.

References

1970 births
Living people
Russian male bobsledders
Olympic bobsledders of Russia
Bobsledders at the 1998 Winter Olympics
Sportspeople from Krasnoyarsk